Lincoln Memorial Bridge is a deck arch bridge carrying U.S. Route 50 Business over the Wabash River between Vincennes, Indiana and Lawrence County, Illinois. It is said to mark the point where Abraham Lincoln crossed the Wabash River on his way to Illinois in 1830, and a sculptural installation, the Lincoln Trail State Memorial, marks the western end of the bridge.

Lincoln Memorial Bridge Pylons
The Lincoln Memorial Bridge Pylons are a public artwork by French artist Raoul Josset, located on the Lincoln Memorial Bridge on U.S. Route 50 on the grounds of the George Rogers Clark National Historical Park. The pylons feature two full-length reliefs of Native American chiefs. The two pylons are made of granite and the figures are on the front faces of the pylons at the entrance to the bridge. The southern figure is dressed in ceremonial regalia with a club in his right hand. The northern figure is also dressed in similar regalia and holds a blanket. The south side of the proper right relief is signed by the artist: RAOUL/JOSSET/SC. They stand at 9.38 × 2.03 × 1.08 ft (286 cm × 62 × 33) and were installed in 1936.

See also
 The Arlington Memorial Bridge in Washington, D.C. is often mistakenly referred to as the Lincoln Memorial Bridge.
 A bridge over the Illinois River called the Abraham Lincoln Memorial Bridge.
 In downtown Milwaukee, Wisconsin, a bridge crossing over Lincoln Memorial Drive next to the Milwaukee Art Museum and War Memorial Center is known as the Lincoln Memorial Bridge.

References

External links
 City of Vincennes Attractions
 Lincoln Memorial Bridge aka Vincennes Bridge
 Smithsonian's Save Outdoor Sculpture! survey of the pylons
 The pylons on Flickr

Road bridges in Illinois
Bridges of the United States Numbered Highway System
Open-spandrel deck arch bridges in the United States
Bridges completed in 1933
Transportation buildings and structures in Lawrence County, Illinois
Vincennes, Indiana
Monuments and memorials in Indiana
Monuments and memorials in Illinois
Transportation buildings and structures in Knox County, Indiana
Wabash River
Road bridges in Indiana
U.S. Route 50
Concrete bridges in the United States
1933 establishments in Indiana
1933 establishments in Illinois